Bhargav Merai (born 2 February 1992) is an Indian cricketer who plays for Gujarat. In October 2019, he was named in India A's squad for the 2019–20 Deodhar Trophy.

References

External links
 

1992 births
Living people
Indian cricketers
Gujarat cricketers
People from Surat